Meena Kumari (born 15 August 1989) is an Indian weightlifter and police officer who  placed fifth in the women's 58 kg weight class at the 2014 Commonwealth Games in Glasgow.

Career

Police service
Kumari joined the Punjab police as a constable after attending college. By 2016, she was an assistant sub-inspector.

Sports career
Kumari was previously a mountaineer and skydiver. She was selected for the 2007-8 National Cadet Corps expedition to Everest, though she did not participate.

Kumari took up weightlifting in 2008 when she attended college at the encouragement of her uncle, who himself participated. After joining the police she was coached by police weightlifter Saranjeet Kundan and sponsored by legislator Pawan Kumar Tinu. She won the gold medal in women's weightlifting in the 63 kg category at the All-India Police Games in December 2013, her third consecutive gold medal at these games. She lifted 110 kg in clean and jerk, two kilos better than her gold in the 58 kg category the previous year.

At the Commonwealth Games in Glasgow in July 2014, Kumari came fifth in the 58 kg category, lifting a total of 194 kg, 83 kg in snatch and 111 kg in clean and jerk.

In May 2016 at the Punjab and Haryana High Court, Kumari successfully appealed a three-year ban imposed by the Indian Weightlifting Federation in November 2014 for unspecified alleged behaviour in training and at the Commonwealth Games but was later proved non guilty and ban was lifted.

In 2017, Kumari took part in the Senior National Powerlifting Championship in Kerala and won a silver medal in the deadlift and bronze in the squat, and came third in the 63 kg category.

Personal life
Kumari is from Jattewali village in Adampur, Punjab, where her father is a tailor. She has three older brothers.

References

External links 
 
 
 

1989 births
Living people
Indian female weightlifters
Sportswomen from Punjab, India
21st-century Indian women
20th-century Indian women
People from Jalandhar district
Indian women police officers
Weightlifters at the 2014 Commonwealth Games
Commonwealth Games competitors for India